Murphy Roths large (MRL/MpJ) is a strain of laboratory mouse developed in 1999 at The Wistar Institute in Philadelphia, Pennsylvania. Originally bred for autoimmune disease research, it was discovered to have remarkable tissue regeneration abilities.

Research 
The MRL/MpJ mouse strain was selectively bred by scientists to have an autoimmune genetic disorder (retained through inbreeding) to be used as a model for autoimmune disease research. After making puncture wounds in their ears, these mice were observed to completely regenerate from these wounds without development of scar tissue. In further research, this mouse strain has been observed to have the ability to also regenerate cardiac tissue, displays a resistance to muscle dystrophy, and is resistant to experiencing hyperglycemia from a diet high in fats.

References

External links 
 The Wistar Institute: Ellen Heber-Katz, Ph.D. Research

Laboratory mouse strains
Regenerative biomedicine